Tomas Runar Svensson (born 15 February 1968) is a Swedish former professional handball goalkeeper who is currently goalkeeping coach of the Swedish men's national handball team, and an assistant coach for FC Barcelona.

Career
Growing up in Eskilstuna it was only natural for him to play for the towns handball team, GUIF, and he was moved up to their senior squad, making his debut in the Swedish top division at the age of 15. In 1988, at the age of 20, he made his first cap for Sweden and in 1990 he was one of the main forces in the national team who won the World Championship in Czechoslovakia. This success landed him a contract with Atlético Madrid BM in Spain where he played for some time before moving to CD Bidasoa. With this team he won his first Spanish championship in 1995. Right after this he moved to Barcelona where he stayed for several seasons, helping the team become the most prominent handball team in the world, winning just about everything there is to win – including international competitions like EHF Champions League and EHF Men's Champions Trophy as well as Spanish competitions like Liga ASOBAL and Copa del Rey de Balonmano. Svensson moved to Germany and HSV Hamburg for a short while before returning to Spain, this time to play for Portland San Antonio. On 8 May 2012, Svensson officially announced his retirement as a player.

Svensson retires (Swedish)

After his playing career, he worked together with Icelandic coach Guðmundur Guðmundsson, first as a goalkeeping coach with the German top team Rhein-Neckar Löwen and later as assistant coach of the Danish national men's team. In 2018, he became goalkeeping coach of the Icelandic national handball team. Between the years of 2014 to 2021 he's been involved with the German team SC Magdeburg, both as a head coach and goalkeeping coach.

In 2021 he became goalkeeping coach for Sweden's national men's team. It was also announced he'll be assistant coach in FC Barcelona from the season of 2021/22.

Player clubs
 Eskilstuna GUIF
 Atlético Madrid BM
 CD Bidasoa
 Barcelona
 HSV Hamburg
 Portland San Antonio
 Pevafersa Valladolid
 Rhein-Neckar Löwen

Trainer teams

  Rhein-Neckar Löwen, goalkeeping coach (2011–2012)
  Rhein-Neckar Löwen, assistant coach (2012–2014)
  Danish men's national team, goalkeeping coach (2014–2016)
  SC Magdeburg, goalkeeping coach (2014–2015)
  SC Magdeburg, head coach (2015–2016)
  SC Magdeburg, goalkeeping coach (2016–2021)
  Icelandic men's national team, goalkeeping coach (2018–2021)
  Eskilstuna Guif, goalkeeping coach (2019)
  Swedish men's national handball team, goalkeeping coach (2021–)
  FC Barcelona, assistant coach (2021–)

Resume
 Caps/goals: 327/0 (1988–2008)
 World champion 1990 (in Prague, Czechoslovakia) and 1999 (in Cairo, Egypt)
 European champion 1994, 2000 and 2002
 2nd place in the 2001 World championship
 3rd place in the 1993 and 1995 World championships
 Participated in three Summer Olympics: Barcelona (1992), Atlanta (1996) and Sydney (2000)
 6 consecutive EHF Champions League titles 1995–2000 (1996–2000 with FC Barcelona)
 Goalkeeper of EHF's Champions League Ultimate Selection in 2013

Aircraft accident
In 1991, Svensson, along with his then girlfriend, survived the Scandinavian Airlines Flight 751 plane crash in Gottröra, Sweden.

Personal life
Svensson settled in Spain after moving to Barcelona, and married a Spanish woman. His son, Max Svensson, is a professional footballer. He is a paternal uncle of Maja Åskag.

References

sports-reference

1968 births
Swedish male handball players
Swedish handball coaches
Handball players at the 1992 Summer Olympics
Handball players at the 1996 Summer Olympics
Handball players at the 2000 Summer Olympics
Olympic handball players of Sweden
Medalists at the 1992 Summer Olympics
Medalists at the 1996 Summer Olympics
Medalists at the 2000 Summer Olympics
Olympic medalists in handball
Olympic silver medalists for Sweden
Liga ASOBAL players
FC Barcelona Handbol players
BM Valladolid players
SDC San Antonio players
Rhein-Neckar Löwen players
Swedish expatriate sportspeople in Germany
Swedish expatriate sportspeople in Spain
Survivors of aviation accidents or incidents
People from Eskilstuna
Living people
Swedish emigrants to Spain
Sportspeople from Södermanland County